Earl of Swinton is a title in the Peerage of the United Kingdom. It was created in 1955 for the prominent Conservative politician Philip Cunliffe-Lister, 1st Viscount Swinton. He had already been created Viscount Swinton, of Masham in the County of York, in 1935, and was made Baron Masham, of Ellington in the County of York, at the same time he was given the earldom. Born Philip Lloyd-Greame, he was the husband of Mary Constance "Molly" Boynton, granddaughter of Samuel Cunliffe-Lister, 1st Baron Masham. When his wife inherited the large Masham estates in 1924, they assumed the surname of Cunliffe-Lister in lieu of Lloyd-Greame.

The earl was succeeded by his grandson, who became the second earl. He was the eldest son of Major the Hon. John Yarburgh Cunliffe-Lister, who was killed in the Second World War. Lord Swinton notably served as Captain of the Yeomen of the Guard (deputy chief government whip in the House of Lords) from 1982 to 1986 in the Conservative administration of Margaret Thatcher. His wife was Susan Cunliffe-Lister, Baroness Masham of Ilton.  the titles are held by Lord Swinton's nephew, the fourth earl, who succeeded his father in that year.

The title is named after Swinton Park near Masham, North Yorkshire. The family seat is now Dykes Hill House, also near Masham.

Earls of Swinton (1955)
Philip Cunliffe-Lister, 1st Earl of Swinton (1884–1972)
 Hon. John Yarburgh Cunliffe-Lister (1913–1943)
David Yarburgh Cunliffe-Lister, 2nd Earl of Swinton (1937–2006)
Nicholas John Cunliffe-Lister, 3rd Earl of Swinton (1939–2021)
 Mark William Philip Cunliffe-Lister, 4th Earl of Swinton (b. 1970), former geophysicist with a degree in Engineering from Durham University, converted former family seat Swinton Park into a luxury hotel

The heir apparent is the present holder's son, William Edward Cunliffe-Lister, Lord Masham (b. 2004)

See also
Baron Masham

Notes

References
Kidd, Charles, Williamson, David (editors). Debrett's Peerage and Baronetage (1990 edition). New York: St Martin's Press, 1990, 

 Peerage News

1955 establishments in England
Noble titles created in 1955
Earldoms in the Peerage of the United Kingdom
 
Noble titles created for UK MPs